Tang Gach is a village in Ruydar Rural District, Ruydar District, Khamir County, Hormozgan Province, Iran. At the 2006 census, its population was 120, in 30 families.

References 

Populated places in Khamir County